Socrates was an Athenian philosopher.

Socrates, Sócrates, Sokrates or Sokratis may also refer to:

People

Given name

Ancient Greeks
 Socrates of Achaea (c. 436–401 BC), mercenary general of the Ten Thousand
 Socrates of Macedon  (4th century BC), a hipparchos or cavalry officer in Alexander the Great's army
 Socrates the Younger (4th century BC), Athenian philosopher
 Socrates Chrestus (died 90–88 BC), Greek prince and King of Bithynia

Religious figures
 martyrs Socrates and Stephen
 Socrates of Constantinople (c. 380–after 439), also known as Socrates Scholasticus, a Byzantine church historian
 Socrates Villegas (born 1960), Roman Catholic archbishop in the Philippines

Athletes
 Sócrates (1954–2011), Brazilian footballer
 Socrates Brito (born 1992), Dominican baseball player
 Sokratis Boudouris (born 1977), Greek footballer
 Sokratis Dioudis (born 1993), Greek football goalkeeper
 Sokratis Fytanidis (born 1984), Greek footballer
 Sokratis Lagoudakis (1861–1944), Greek track athlete
 Sokratis Ofrydopoulos (born 1973), Greek football manager and former player
 Sokratis Papastathopoulos (born 1988), Greek footballer
 Sócrates Pedro (born 1992), Portuguese footballer
 Sokratis Tsoukalas (born 1992), Greek footballer

Politicians, soldiers and businesspeople
 Socrates N. Sherman (1801–1873), U.S. Representative from New York and American Civil War officer
 Socrates Nelson (1814–1867), American businessman and politician
 Sócrates Rizzo (born 1945), Mexican politician
 Sokrates Starynkiewicz (1820–1902), Russian general and mayor of Warsaw
 Sokratis Kokkalis (born 1939), Greek businessman and billionaire

Writers
 Sócrates Nolasco (1884–1980), writer from the Dominican Republic
 Sokratis Giolias (1973–2010), assassinated Greek journalist
 Sokratis Skartsis (born 1936), Greek poet

Other
 Sokratis Malamas (born 1957), Greek singer/songwriter
 Socrates Hotchkiss Tryon, Sr. (1816–1855), American pioneer physician in the Oregon Territory

Surname
 Jeanne Socrates (born 1941 or 1942), British yachtswoman and solo circumnavigator
 José Sócrates (born 1957), Prime Minister of Portugal (2005–2011)

In literature
 Socrates, the name used by Petrarch to refer to his dear friend Lodewijk Heyligen in his writings
 Socrates, a pseudonym for the mentor-like figure in the books of Dan Millman

Arts and entertainment
 Socrates (Voltaire), a play
 Socrates (film), a 1971 film directed by Roberto Rossellini
 Sócrates (film), a 2018 film directed by Alexandre Moratto
 Socrates (sculpture), a 1950 outdoor sculpture by W. V. Casey
 Socrates Drank the Conium (sometimes abbreviated to "Socrates"), a Greek rock band
 Socrates II, a chess-playing computer program
 Socrates "Cooch" Windgrass, a character in the comic strip Footrot Flats
 Socrates, the lion from the film Animals United
 Socrates the Scarecrow, a character from the 1961 animated television series Tales of the Wizard of Oz and the 1964 animated television movie sequel Return to Oz

Other uses
 Socrates programme, a European education programme
 VTech Socrates, an educational video game system
 SOCRATES (satellite), a Japanese satellite
 Socrates (pain assessment), a mnemonic used in the evaluation of a patient's pain
 Project Socrates, a classified US Defense Intelligence Agency program established in 1983
 Socrates Sculpture Park, New York City
 Socrates, Georgia, a community in the United States
 Socrates Mountain, a mountain in West Virginia

See also
 Socrate, a symphonic drama about the philosopher Socrates by Erik Satie
 "Sokrati", the Greek entry in the Eurovision Song Contest 1979
 Saukrates (born 1978), Canadian rapper